Albanian Basketball Supercup  is an event started only from 1999 and involves the Albanian Basketball League champions and Albanian Basketball Cup winners of the previous season. The Supercup consists in a single match which is always played the year after major events have ended and right before the new season start.

The team with most trophies is PBC Flamurtari with 14 Supercups. Most recent trophy was won from B.C Partizani.

Winners

Performance by club
PBC Flamurtari 14 times

PBC Tirana 3 times

Skënderbeu Korçë 2 times

BC Luftëtari 2 times

B.C Apolonia 1 time

B.C Partizani 1 time

References

External links

Supercup
Women's basketball supercup competitions in Europe
1999 establishments in Albania
Women's basketball competitions in Albania